The 2016 season is Orlando Pride's inaugural season. The team competes in the National Women's Soccer League, the top division of women's soccer in the United States.

Team launch
The team was launched at a press conference held at Lake Eola Park in Downtown Orlando on October 20, 2015. At that time, it was announced that Tom Sermanni, previously the manager of both the Australian and United States women's national teams, would be the team's first manager. It was also announced that the team would share its home with Orlando City SC, beginning at Camping World Stadium in 2016, and eventually moving to Orlando City Stadium.

Squad information

Coaching staff

Roster
The NWSL held an Expansion Draft to populate the Pride's roster on November 2, 2015. The Pride held the first pick in the 2016 NWSL College Draft, though it traded that pick to Portland Thorns FC in exchange for Alex Morgan and Kaylyn Kyle. It will get the first pick in the subsequent rounds of the College Draft. Orlando will also receive top priority in player discovery and the waiver wire.

Preseason non-roster invitees

NWSL College Draft
Draft picks are not automatically signed to the team roster. The 2016 NWSL College Draft was held on January 15, 2016. Orlando had three selections.

Match results

Preseason

National Women's Soccer League 

All times in regular season on Eastern Daylight Time (UTC-04:00).

It was announced on February 17, 2016, that the Pride would open their inaugural season on the road on April 17 at Portland Thorns FC, and would host Houston Dash for their home opener on April 23. The remainder of the schedule was released the next day.

The Pride's "local opponent" by league definition is the Houston Dash. They will play the Dash four times this year, and every other team home-and-away.

Results summary

Results

League standings

Honors and awards

NWSL Awards

NWSL Team of the Year

NWSL Goalkeeper of the Year

NWSL Weekly Awards

NWSL Player of the Week

NWSL Goal of the Week

NWSL Save of the Week

Media
All NWSL matches not aired through their national contract with Fox Sports 1 are livestreamed on the NWSL's YouTube channel. Orlando Pride home matches are being called by Orlando City play-by-play announcer Jeff Radcliffe and color commentator Becky Burleigh, head coach of the Florida Gators women's soccer team.

Squad statistics
Source: NWSL

Images

Notes

References

External links

 

 
 
 
 
 

Orlando Pride
Orlando Pride seasons
Orlando Pride
Orlando Pride